Morning Star Lake may refer to:

 Morning Star Lake (Glacier County, Montana), in Glacier National Park
 Morning Star Lake (Nebraska), a lake in Merrick County